Anna Julia Hede Wilkens (born 16 February 1962) is a Swedish film director, photographer and former child actress, well known for her role as Fia in Den vita stenen (1973 TV series). In 1986–89, she studied at Dramatiska Institutet. Now she works as teacher at Täby Enskilda gymnasium. She hosts the TV program Nyfiken.

Hede Wilkens has worked since 2015 as a teacher of television production and French at Täby Enskilda Gymnasium secondary school. She hosts the television program Curiosos, which is given on the TV channel TV Nord and filmed in the television studio at Täby Enskilda Gymnasium school.

References and sources

Lönen för Vita stenen: 0 kronor
Julia Hede

Living people
Swedish photographers
Swedish child actresses
1962 births
Swedish film directors
Swedish women film directors
Swedish television actresses
Dramatiska Institutet alumni
Swedish women photographers